Keiji Yamaguchi (山口圭司 Yamaguchi Keiji, born February 17, 1974) is a former professional boxer from Hakodate, Hokkaido, Japan. Yamaguchi held the WBA light flyweight championship of the world, defeating Panamanian champion Carlos Murillo in 1996 via a 12th-round split decision. He became Japan's 37th world champion.

After he had won the world championship, he had only defended the title once by defeating his old rival Carlos Murillo in the middle of the same year via a 12th-round unanimous decision. Later on, he was suddenly lost in the end of the year 1996, when he lost by TKO just the second round against the Thai challenger Pichit Chor Siriwat (previously known as Pichitnoi Sitbangprachan) in a bout at Osaka Prefectural Gymnasium, Osaka. He was hit by Chor Siriwat's right hook. When got up, the referee stopped the contest because he was not in a condition to continue fighting.

Yamaguchi is regarded as a Japanese boxer who had the opportunity to challenge for several world championships. In 1995, he challenged for the first world championship against Choi Hi-yong, a South Korean crown holder, but he was defeated via a 12th-round split decision.

After that, he challenged two more world championships, in the WBA flyweight division against José Bonilla from Venezuela in 1997 and the WBC super flyweight division with South Korea's In-Joo Cho in 1999. But were all defeated, including challenging the WBC super flyweight international championship with  Gerry Peñalosa, a former Filipino world champion, he was defeated by TKO just the first round in 2001 in the Philippines.

His nicknamed "Prince" because his idol is Naseem Hamed, a superstar British boxer of Yemeni descent in featherweight class. Hence, he imitated Hamed's nerves fighting style, including trunks design as well.

See also 
 List of WBA world champions
 List of light flyweight boxing champions
 List of Japanese boxing world champions
 Boxing in Japan

References

External links 
 

1974 births
Light-flyweight boxers
Living people
World Boxing Association champions
Japanese male boxers
People from Hakodate
Super-flyweight boxers
Flyweight boxers
Southpaw boxers